The Delta League was a Class D level minor league baseball league that played in the 1904 season. The six–team Delta League consisted of franchises based in Mississippi. The Delta League permanently folded after the 1904 season.

History
The Delta League began play on May 9, 1904, as four charter members formed for the 1910 Class D level League. The Delta League League started the season with the Brookhaven, Mississippi team, Clarksdale (baseball) team, Jackson Senators and Yazoo City Zoos were the four charter members. On May 16, 1904, teams from Canton, Mississippi and Hattiesburg, Mississippi were added to the league after the season started. The 1904 league presidents were S.L. Dodds and V.M. Scanlan.

The league schedule ended on September 3, 1904. The final Delta League standings were led by the 1st place Clarksdale team, who ended with a record of 67–31, finishing 4.0 games ahead of the 2nd place Yazoo City Zoos (62–34). They were followed by followed by 3rd place Canton (43–45), the Jackson Senators (47–53), Hattiesburg (36–49) and Brookhaven (27–70) in the six–team league. The league did not have playoffs in 1904.

The Delta League permanently folded after playing their only season in 1904. Sources indicate the league formed in 1905, but no teams or statistics are known for a 1905 Delta League season.

1904 Delta League teams

Standings and statistics

1904 Delta League

References

Defunct minor baseball leagues in the United States
Baseball leagues in Mississippi
Defunct professional sports leagues in the United States
Sports leagues established in 1904
Sports leagues disestablished in 1904